Fellhanera is a genus of mostly leaf-dwelling lichens in the family Pilocarpaceae. The genus, circumscribed by lichenologist Antonín Vězda in 1986, honours Austrian lichenologist Josef Hafellner.

Species
, Species Fungorum accepts 56 species of Fellhanera.
Fellhanera africana 
Fellhanera albidocincta 
Fellhanera antennophora 
Fellhanera atrofuscatula 
Fellhanera baeomycoides 
Fellhanera borbonica 
Fellhanera bouteillei 
Fellhanera bullata 
Fellhanera chejuensis 
Fellhanera christiansenii 
Fellhanera colchica 
Fellhanera crucitignorum 
Fellhanera dominicana 
Fellhanera endopurpurea 
Fellhanera eriniae 
Fellhanera fallax 
Fellhanera flavostanhopeae 
Fellhanera fragilis 
Fellhanera fuscatula 
Fellhanera granulosa 
Fellhanera guatemalensis 
Fellhanera gyrophorica 
Fellhanera hybrida 
Fellhanera incolorata 
Fellhanera ivoriensis 
Fellhanera laeticolor 
Fellhanera mackeei 
Fellhanera maritima 
Fellhanera mastothallina 
Fellhanera microdiscus 
Fellhanera minnisinkorum 
Fellhanera montesfumosi 
Fellhanera naevia 
Fellhanera nashii 
Fellhanera obscurata 
Fellhanera ochracea 
Fellhanera parvula 
Fellhanera pluviosilvestris 
Fellhanera punctata 
Fellhanera rhaphidophylli 
Fellhanera robusta 
Fellhanera rubrolecanorina 
Fellhanera semecarpi 
Fellhanera silhouettae 
Fellhanera silicis 
Fellhanera stictae 
Fellhanera stipitata 
Fellhanera submicrommata 
Fellhanera subtilis 
Fellhanera tasmanica 
Fellhanera termitophila 
Fellhanera tricharioides 
Fellhanera tropica 
Fellhanera tubulifera 
Fellhanera verrucifera 
Fellhanera viridisorediata

References

Pilocarpaceae
Lichen genera
Lecanorales genera
Taxa described in 1986
Taxa named by Antonín Vězda